The Z61/62 Beijing-Changchun Through Train is a Chinese passenger train running between the capital Beijing and Changchun, the capital of Jilin, operated by the Shenyang Railway Bureau. Changchun passenger segment is responsible for passenger transportation, Changchun originating on the Beijing train. 25T type passenger trains are used along the Jingha Railway across Jilin, Liaoning, Hebei, Tianjin, Beijing and other provinces and cities, for the entire . Travel time from Beijing railway station to Changchun railway station is 8 hours and 28 minutes on train number Z61, while travel time from Changchun to Beijing is 8 hours and 11 minutes on its counterpart, train number Z62.

Carriages

Locomotives

Timetable

See also 
Z63/64 Beijing-Changchun Through Train
Z721/Z722 Beijing-Changchun Through Train
D19/20 Beijing-Changchun Through Train
D23/24 Beijing-Changchun Through Train
G399/400 Beijing-Changchun Through Train

References

External links 
 长春---北京Z62次直达列车全面提速背后的故事

Passenger rail transport in China
Rail transport in Beijing
Rail transport in Jilin